İzzet Mehmet Pasha Mosque is an 18th-century mosque in Safranbolu of Karabük Province, Turkey.

Geography
The street in front of the mosque is Adnan Menderes street which connects Safranbolu to nearby Karabük. The mosque is a part of the  historic places of the city which are included in the List of World Heritage Sites in Turkey.

History
The mosque had been commissioned by Safranbolulu Izzet Mehmet Pasha, who was born in Safranbolu. İzzet Mehmet Pasha was a grand vizier of the Ottoman Empire twice during the reign of Abdul Hamid I, and once during the reign of Selim III. The mosque was constructed between 1794-1798 during his last service.

The building
The one minaret mosque can be considered as a small külliye (complex) with several vakıf (foundation) shops a library and two fountains. The base area of the mosque is inclined ground. More over there is an underground creek beneath the building. The problem had been solved by elevating the floor of the building and placing it on arches. The praying room is square with dimensions 13.5  x 13.5 m2. (44.4 x 44.4 ft2 ). Both the mimbar and the mihrab are luxuriously decorated. There is a tughra of Selim III on the mimbar.
The general appearance of the mosque resembles that of Nuruosmaniye Mosque in Istanbul, built in 1750s.

References

External links

For images

Buildings and structures in Karabük Province
Safranbolu District
Mosques in Safranbolu
Religious buildings and structures completed in 1798
Ottoman architecture in Turkey
18th-century mosques